Anders Myklebust (born 29 February 1928) is a Norwegian politician for the Christian Democratic Party.

He served as a deputy representative to the Norwegian Parliament from Sogn og Fjordane during the term 1969–1973. In total he met during 26 days of parliamentary session.

References

1928 births
Living people
Deputy members of the Storting
Christian Democratic Party (Norway) politicians
Sogn og Fjordane politicians
Place of birth missing (living people)
20th-century Norwegian politicians